Caira may refer to:
 Caira County, in New South Wales, Australia
 Reece Caira (born 1993), Australian footballer
 Caira Moreira-Brown (born 1996), US épée fencer

See also 
 Ciara (disambiguation)
 Ceira (disambiguation)
 Kaira (disambiguation)